Ian Broughton Watson (7 June 1949 – 24 July 1981) was an Australian basketball player. He competed in the men's tournament at the 1972 Summer Olympics and the 1976 Summer Olympics.

References

External links
 

1949 births
1981 deaths
Deaths from cancer in Victoria (Australia)
Australian men's basketball players
1974 FIBA World Championship players
Olympic basketball players of Australia
Basketball players at the 1972 Summer Olympics
Basketball players at the 1976 Summer Olympics
Basketball players from Melbourne